Florian Marc Ballhaus (born 1965) is a German cinematographer. He is best known for his work on The Devil Wears Prada, Marry Me and the movies directed by Robert Schwentke, such as Flightplan, The Time Traveler's Wife and The Divergent Series: Insurgent.

He is also son of the late cinematographer Michael Ballhaus.

Life and career
Ballhaus was born in Baden-Baden, Germany, the son of Helga Mavia Betten and noted German cinematographer Michael Ballhaus. At the age of 16, he moved to the U.S. with his family, when his father began working on American films such as After Hours. He began working as a second cinematographer's assistant and then later as a camera assistant and operator. He returned to Germany in his adulthood to make his own name in his father's profession, debuting in episodes of the television show, Alles außer Mord, then in 1996 with Sandman. He returned to the U.S. seven years later to shoot episodes of Sex and the City.

In 2005, he earned praise for his work in the thriller Flightplan. Later he reunited with David Frankel, one of the Sex and the City directors, for The Devil Wears Prada.

Filmography

Films

Television
TV series

TV movies

References

External links

1965 births
German cinematographers
German expatriates in the United States
Living people
People from Baden-Baden
Film people from Baden-Württemberg